The Centre of Liaison and Information of Masonic Powers Signatories of Strasbourg Appeal (French: Centre de Liaison et d'Information des Puissances maçonniques Signataires de l'Appel de Strasbourg) or CLIPSAS is an international group of Masonic Grand Orients and Grand Lodges that adhere to Continental Freemasonry and signed the Strasbourg Appeal.  Members include the Grand Orient de France, the Grand Orient of Belgium and the Grand Lodge of Italy, of which the first two left the group between 2000-2010.

Since 2011 it has had Special Consultative Status at the UNESCO

Members
Source: CLIPSAS
  Grand Orient de France, founder 1961, absent between 1996 and 2010, reintegrated in 2010  
  Grand Orient of Belgium, founder 1961, absent between 1996 and 2008, reintegrated in 2008
  Grand Lodge of Italy, founder 1961
  Grand Orient of Switzerland, founder 1961 
  Grand Orient of Austria, founder 1961 
  Grand Orient of Luxembourg, founder 1961 
  Serenísima Gran Logia de Lengua Española, founder 1961
  Grand Lodge of Denmark of Ancient Free & Accepted Masons, 1970 
  Mixed Grand Lodge of Puerto Rico, 1976 
  George Washington Union, 1979 
  Grand Lodge of the Republic of Venezuela, 1980 
  Grand Rite malgache, 1981 
  Omega Grand Lodge of the State of New York, 1982 
  United Grand Orient and Lodge of Cameroon, 1982 
  Symbolic Grand Lodge of Spain, 1983 
  French Federation of "Droit Humain", 1983 (absent between 1996 and 2011), reintegrated in 2012
  Mixed Universal Grand Lodge, 1984, rejoined in May 2013
  Mixed Grand Lodge of France, 1984, rejoined in May 2013
  Grand Orient of the Congo, 1984 
  Female Grand Lodge of Belgium, 1984 
  Nederlandse Grootloge der Gemengde Vrijmetsalerij, 1985 
  Grande Oriente Lusitano, 1985 
  Grande Loge haïtienne de St. Jean des Orients d'Outre-Mer, 1985 
  Grande Loge d'Haïti de 1961, 1987 
  HUMANITAS - Freimaurergrossloge für Frauen und Männer in Deutschland, 1987 
  Gran Oriente Latino Americano, 1987
  Grand Lodge of the Republic of Benin, 1988 
  Großloge Humanitas Austria, 1989 
  Grands Orient et Loge associés du Congo, 1989 
  Liberal Grand Lodge of Turkey, 1989 
  Mixed Grand Lodge of Chile, 1991 
  French Grand Lodge of Memphis-Misraïm, 1991 
  Female Grande Lodge of Memphis-Misraïm, 1992 
  Helvetic Symbolic Grand Lodge, 1992 
  Grande Eburnie, 1992 
  Female Grand Lodge of Chile, 1994 
  Female Grand Lodge of Italy, 1995 
  Grande Loja Unida do Paraná, 1995 
  Serenissime Grand Orient de Grece, 1996 https://www.sgog.gr/home
  Grande Loge des Caraïbes, 1997 
  Grand Orient of Mexico, 1997 
  National Grand Lodge of Canada, 1997 
  Grande Oriente Nacional Gloria do Occidente do Brasil, 1998 
  Gran Logia del Norte de Colombia, 2000 
  Grande Loja Maçonica Mixta do Brasil, 2001 
  International Masonic Order of Delphi, 2001 
  Central Grand Lodge of Lebanon, 2002 
  Mixed Grand Orient of Greece, 2002 
  Grande Loja Unida de Pernambuco, 2002 
  Mixed Grand Lodge of Memphis-Misraïm, 2003 
  Central Grand Lodge of Colombia, 2003 
  Grande Loge des Cèdres, 2003 
  Symbolic Masculine Grand Lodge of Africa, 2003 
  Grand Rite Malagasy Féminin, 2003 
  Grande Oriente Masónico Chileno, 2004 
  Gran Logia Femenina de Argentina, 2004 
  Grande Loja Feminina da Maçonaria Brasileira, 2005 
  Grande Loja Arquitetos de Aquário, 2005 
  Grand Lodge Bet-El, 2005 
  Female Grand Lodge of Romania, 2006 
  Benjamin Herrera, 2006
  Grande Loge indépendante et souveraine des Rites unis, 2008
  Gran Oriente de la Francmasonaria Mixta Universal, 2008
  Grand Lodge of Morocco, 2008
  Constitutional Grand Lodge of Peru, 2009 
  Federal Grand Orient of the Republic of Argentina, 2009 
  Grand Orient of El Salvador, 2009 
  Gran Logia Hiram Habif, 2009 
  Grand Orient of Romania, 2009 
  National United Grand Lodge of Romania, 2009 
  Federación Colombiana de Logias Masónicas, 2010 
  Grande Loja Feminina do Brasil, 2010 
  Gran Orient de Catalunya, 2011 
  Lithos - Confédération de loges, 2011 
  Liberal Grand Lodge of Austria, 2011 
  United Grand Lodge of Lebanon, 2011 
  Grand Lodge of Belgium, 2011 
  Gran Logia Oriental del Perú, 2011 
  Sovereign Grand Lodge of Venezuela, 2011
  Grande Oriente Ibérico, 2012
  Grande Loge mixte souveraine, 2014
  Ordre initiatique et traditionnel de l'art royal, 2014
  Grande Loge Symbolique travaillant au Rite Écossais Primitif, 2014
  Grand Lodge ANI of Canada, 2016
  Grand Orient de Canaan, 2017
  Albanian Grand Lodge/Grande Loge Albanaise – ILLYRIA (since 2018)
  Grand Orient of Slovenia (since 2016)
  Ordine Massonico Tradizionale Italiano (since 2022)

See also
 International Secretariat of the Masonic Adogmatic Powers
 Association maçonnique internationale

References

External links 

Freemasonry
Organizations based in Strasbourg